USS Rhea (AMc-58) was a coastal minesweeper acquired by the U.S. Navy for the dangerous task of removing mines from minefields laid in the water to prevent ships from passing.

The first ship to be named Rhea by the Navy, AMc-58 was laid down as a wooden purse-seiner, Hull No. 250, by the Martinolich Shipbuilding Company; purchased on the ways by the Navy 31 December 1940 and designated AMc-58; named Rhea, 5 March 1941; launched 9 August 1941; sponsored by Miss Marjorie Strong; and placed in service 15 October 1941.

World War II service 
Fitted out at San Diego, California, Rhea, equipped with acoustical, magnetic, and "O"-type gear, remained on the U.S. West Coast, at San Francisco, California, until she sailed west in early March 1942 to assume duties in the 14th Naval District. Arriving at Pearl Harbor 11 March, she operated in Hawaiian waters until she returned to San Diego after the end of World War II.

Placed out of service 22 January 1946, she was struck from the Navy list 7 February 1946; released to the Maritime Commission 30 December 1947, and, subsequently, sold to Demiter J. Callian.

References

External links 
 NavSource Online: Mine Warfare Vessel Photo Archive - Rhea (AMc 58)

Ships built in Dockton, Washington
1941 ships
Minesweepers of the United States Navy
World War II minesweepers of the United States